Redemptus of the Cross (also Redemptorus), (15 March 1598 – 27 November 1638) was a Portuguese lay brother in the Order of Discalced Carmelites. He was put to death along with other members of a group sent to Aceh by Portuguese authorities.

Life
He was born Tomás Rodrigues da Cunha in Paredes de Coura, Portugal on 15 March 1598. He first served as a soldier in the Portuguese army in India, where he joined the Carmelites in Goa as a lay brother in 1615, taking the name Redemptus of the Cross.

Redemptus was sent by the superiors of the Order to accompany Father Denis of the Nativity as part of an ambassadorial mission from the Portuguese Empire to the Sultan of Aceh. The mission was led by Dom Francisco Sousa de Castro as ambassador.

Once in Aceh, all the members of the mission were seized and arrested, at the instigation of the Dutch authorities based in Jakarta. They were then subjected to torture, and those members of the mission who refused to deny their faith were executed one by one. The two friars were led to a desolate spot on the seashore, where Redemptus was shot with arrows, after which his throat was slit. Father Denis, a crucifix in his hands, was the last to die, his skull shattered by a blow of a scimitar.

Castro, the ambassador, was the only survivor. He was held in captivity for three years, until his family paid a large ransom for his release.

Veneration
Redemptus of the Cross was beatified on 10 June 1900 by Pope Leo XIII, together with Denis of the Nativity. Their feast day in the Calendar of Saints of the Order is the 29 November.

Prayer

References

External links
 Blessed Redemptorus of the Cross  at SQPN

1598 births
1638 deaths
People from Viana do Castelo District
16th-century Portuguese people
17th-century Portuguese people
Portuguese soldiers
Discalced Carmelites
Portuguese Roman Catholic missionaries
Carmelite beatified people
16th-century venerated Christians
17th-century venerated Christians
17th-century Roman Catholic martyrs
Portuguese beatified people
Portuguese Roman Catholic saints
Beatified Roman Catholic religious brothers
People murdered in Indonesia
Portuguese people murdered abroad
Roman Catholic missionaries in Indonesia
Portuguese torture victims
Christians executed for refusing to convert to Islam
Deaths by blade weapons
Venerated Catholics
Beatifications by Pope Leo XIII